All City is the second full-length album by New York City-based hip hop group Northern State, released on August 17, 2004 on Columbia Records. It is also their major-label debut, as it was their first album released for Columbia. It has also been described as their first "real record", because some do not consider their debut album Dying in Stereo to be a full-length album, but an EP. The album's first single was "Girl for All Seasons", for which a music video was made at the Siberia club in New York City.

Recording
All City was recorded in Philadelphia with a handful of guest artists, including Martin Luther McCoy (on "Siren Song"), Har Mar Superstar (on "Summer Never Ends"), and the High & Mighty (on "Think Twice"). Also contributing to the album's recording were ?uestlove, as well as DJ Muggs of Cypress Hill, and Pete Rock, both of whom helped produce the album.

Critical reception

All City received generally favorable reviews from music critics and was named one of the 50 best albums of 2004 by Rolling Stone.

Track listing

Personnel

Jim Bottari – engineer, mixing
Chuck Brody – engineer
Katie Cassidy – additional personnel, guitar, harp, photography
Thera L. Choice – beat box, drum programming, organ, piano
Fusako Chubachi – design
Chris Conway – engineer
DJ Drez – additional personnel, cut
DJ Mighty Mi – audio production, producer
Chris Fargo – additional personnel, guitar
John Fields – acoustic bass guitar, additional personnel, bass, beats, guitar (electric), producer, synthesizer, wurlitzer, wurlitzer piano
Mark Grant – engineer
Mike Halpern – additional personnel, drums, percussion
Steven Halpern – additional personnel, bass, drum programming, guitar, guitar (bass), keyboards, organ, piano, programming
Michael Halsband – cover photo, photography
Har Mar Superstar – additional personnel, featured artist, guest artist, primary artist, vocals
The High & Mighty – additional personnel, featured artist, guest artist, vocals
Rob Hill – additional personnel, bass, engineer, guitar, keyboards, mixing, programming, strings, synthesizer
Dana Klein – additional personnel, vocals
Thera L – additional personnel, drum programming, organ, piano
Alice Lord – additional personnel, violin
Rogelio Lozano – bass, guitar
Colin Malley – interpretation
Manifest – audio production, producer
Mr. Eon – additional personnel, vocals
Mister Wohlsen – engineer
Muggs – audio production, producer
Peter Phillips – mixing, producer
Hesta Prynn – group member, member of attributed artist, piano, vocals
Damian Quiñones – additional personnel, piano, reproduction, sound effects, vocals
Geoffrey Rice – assistant engineer
Pete Rock – additional personnel, audio production, vocals
Johnny Rodeo – engineer
Sami Ryan – assistant engineer
Skotch Rockie – bass
Spero – engineer, member of attributed artist, vocals
Sprout – drum machine, drums, group member, member of attributed artist, photography, vocals
Jamey Staub – engineer, mixing
Yutakha – engineer
Grover Zinn – engineer

References

Northern State (band) albums
Columbia Records albums
2004 albums